Pete McQueen (March 26, 1909 – May 1985) was an American baseball outfielder in the Negro leagues. He played with several clubs from 1932 to 1937.

References

External links
 and Seamheads

Little Rock Grays players
Pittsburgh Crawfords players
Memphis Red Sox players
1909 births
1985 deaths
Baseball players from Arkansas
Baseball outfielders
20th-century African-American sportspeople